Mina (born 4 October 1993) is a German pop musician who became famous because of a video at the online portal Myvideo which was watched by four million viewers.

Biography 
Mina was born in Munich, where she attended a private school. When she was 13 years old, she went to a music studio in Augsburg where she recorded the song "How The Angels Fly"'. This song peaked at #24 of the German music charts. After that, she produced a music video for the song which reached high popularity at the video portals of Myvideo and YouTube, resulting in a recording contract with Warner Music.

Her first album was released on 14 December 2007 and was called Learn To Fly. It peaked at #77 in the German album charts.

Her single "I will Not Let You Down" appeared on the German soundtrack release of the movie Juno.

Since May 2008 Mina hosts the show mädchen.tv, the TV format of the youth magazine of the same name.

Discography

Singles
 2007: How The Angels Fly
 2008: I will not let you down

Albums 
 2007: Learn To Fly

Awards 
 2008: Radio Regenbogen Award – Internet Award 2007
 2008: DIVA Award – Web-Artist of the Year

References

External links 
 Mina on MySpace
 Official MyVideo site with a diary
 Die Prinzessin aus dem Netz (article from the Süddeutsche Zeitung) 28 October 2007
 Die Lolita aus dem Netz (article from the Süddeutsche Zeitung) 21 November 2008
 Official Mädchen TV site

Warner Music Group artists
Living people
Musicians from Munich
1993 births
21st-century German women singers